Cheiracanthium insigne, is a species of spider of the genus Cheiracanthium. It is found in India, Sri Lanka, Thailand, Myanmar, Laos, China. The species is sometimes classified as a senior synonym of Eutittha gracilipes.

See also 
 List of Eutichuridae species

References

insigne
Spiders of Asia
Spiders described in 1874